Alexander Anton von Zagareli (also Cagareli or Tsagareli, Georgian: ალექსანდრე ანტონის ძე ცაგარელი;  9 December 1844 – 12 November 1929) was a Georgian linguist. He was professor at Saint Petersburg State University an co-founder of Tbilisi State University.

Zagareli was born in Kaspi, Georgia. He studied at the University of Tübingen, Vienna, Munich, and Saint Petersburg. In 1869 he became a member of Landsmannschaft Schottland. Zagareli habilitated at age 27 at the Saint Petersburg State University. There he became a docent for Georgian Literature and later professor for Oriental Languages. Nicholas Marr was one of his most famous students. Zagareli remained  at the Georgian language department at Saint Petersburg for over half a century, until his return to Georgia in 1922. The nearly 80-year-old Zagareli left Russia to take up academic positions at Tbilisi State University.

He died in Tbilisi and was interred at the Mtatsminda Pantheon.

Honours 
 Order of St. Stanislaus, 1st class

References 

Ehlich, Konrad: Bibliography on Writing and Written Language. Vol. 1, DeGruyter, 1996.
Tuite, Kevin: (2008): "The Rise and Fall and Revival of the Ibero-Caucasian Hypothesis", Historiographia Linguistica Vol. 35, No. 1-2.

Linguists from Georgia (country)
Ludwig Maximilian University of Munich alumni
University of Tübingen alumni
University of Vienna alumni
Academic staff of Saint Petersburg State University
Academic staff of Tbilisi State University
1844 births
1929 deaths
Burials at Mtatsminda Pantheon
Kartvelian studies scholars